Edgemont Park is a park in Montclair, New Jersey, in the United States of America. It shares a name with the nearby Edgemont Elementary School.

History
A committee for park construction in 1906 decided to purchase the land for the park with a $100,000 bond issue, following a town referendum.  The effort to buy the land was led by William B. Dickson, who backed a quarter of the bonds issued.  The land which comprised the park was originally a golf course, built 10 years prior to the park's founding. Edgemont was originally named the Harrison Tract park.  The memorial was dedicated in 1925.

Overview
The park is surrounded by roads on three sides, and by the rears of residential lots on the remaining southern side.  To the north is a street named after the park, Parkway, and to the West, Edgemont Road.  Across this road is Edgemont Elementary School.  On the East, Valley Road borders the park. In the eastern part of the park there is a pond with fountains, fed and flowing into Toney's Brook.  The pond is artificial, created by a dam, and has severe growth of algae and scum.  This scum has damaged the health of Toney's Brook downstream.  An accessible children's playground is here.

Memorial
The most prominent feature of the park is the pond and the small island with the World War I memorial on it. Edgemont Park is known for its World War I memorial, which is one of the landmarks of Montclair. The main memorial, created in 1924 by Charles Keck, is a tall obelisk with bronze sculptures of Winged Victory on top and the Billy Boys on the bottom. On the sides of the obelisk are etched the names of those who fell in the First World War, to whom the monument is dedicated.  In front of the memorial there are small plaques that have the names of those who died in the Vietnam War and Korean War and World War II.

Amenities
 Baseball/softball diamonds
 Pond
 Shelter house with restrooms and kitchen
 Children's playground
 Bikeways and Footpaths
 Ice skating in the winter, outdoor
 Band concerts
 Fourth of July picnic
 Holiday memorial services
 Memorial Obelisk
 Cherepovets Garden

Gallery

References

Parks in New Jersey
Montclair, New Jersey
Parks in Essex County, New Jersey
Protected areas established in 1906
1906 establishments in New Jersey